Rodu is a village in Ladnu tehsil of Nagaur district in the Indian state of Rajasthan.

Location 
Rodu is situated at a distance of 22 km from Ladnu in the east direction.and 160 km from Jaipur

Occupation 
Main occupation of people is agriculture and government/private jobs. Some villagers are employed in government services and many people are doing private jobs in other states and countries.

Transport 

Rodoo is connected to nearby villages through the road network with presence of State Transport Service and Private Bus Services which link it to Ladnu, Didwana.

Geography 

Demographics 
 India Census, Rodu had a population of 5613. Male population is 2847, while female population is 2766.
All cast living in village
Muslim Kayamkhani

References 

Villages in Nagaur district